Triboltingen is a small village in the canton of Thurgau in Switzerland, situated on the south shore of the Untersee part of Lake Constance. Since 1975, it is politically part of Ermatingen.

Geography of Thurgau
Villages in Switzerland
Former municipalities of Thurgau